Clifford S. Cormell Field at Sparrow Stadium is a baseball stadium on the campus of Francis Marion University in Florence, South Carolina. Part of the $11.1 million R. Gerald Griffin Athletic Complex, Sparrow Stadium is the home field for the Francis Marion Patriots baseball team. Sparrow Stadium also hosts some home games for the Florence–Darlington Technical College Stingers baseball team.

Sparrow Stadium was the home field of the Florence Flamingos, a collegiate summer baseball team in the Coastal Plain League, from 2012 to 2021. The then Florence RedWolves moved to Sparrow Stadium in the middle of the 2012 season because Florence's American Legion Field, built in 1968, no longer met Coastal Plain League standards, lacking a visitors clubhouse and having questionable field conditions. Sparrow Stadium hosted the Coastal Plain League All-Star Game on July 12, 2015. The Flamingos moved in 2022 to the new Carolina Bank Field in Florence.

References

External links
 Florence Flamingos - official site
 Coastal Plain League - official site

College baseball venues in the United States
Sports venues in Florence County, South Carolina
Baseball venues in South Carolina
Buildings and structures in Florence, South Carolina
2012 establishments in South Carolina
Sports venues completed in 2012
Francis Marion Patriots baseball